Ralph B. Rensen was an English Grand Prix motorcycle road racer. 

Rensen was killed on 16 June 1961 while competing in the 1961 Isle of Man TT, aged 28 years.

He was born in Liverpool.  His father was Dutch and an executive with a firm in Crosby.  Ralph attended St Mary's College, Crosby.  He is buried in the Borough Cemetery,  Douglas Isle Of Man, almost directly opposite the grandstand. 

From 1953 up to his death in 1961 he competed in every year of the Isle of Man TT.

He started his racing career in the Manx Grand Prix of 1953 in the 350cc 'Junior' class but did not finish the race. 
The race in the 500cc 'Senior' class he finished 33rd.

The next year, 1954, he finished in the 350cc in 14th place.

From 1955 up to and including 1960 he competed in the Junior TT, the Senior TT and the Ulster Grand Prix. 
All these years he rode Norton Manx models, except for the 250cc Velocette in 1957 which he failed to finish, and a one-off appearance with the NSU Sportmax of Fron Purslow in 1960, after Purslow had injured himself in training.

In 1959 he also started in the 500cc-class of the French GP. 

In 1960 he won his first championship points when finishing fifth in the 350cc and fourth after a photo finish in the 500cc Ulster Grand Prix. These results led to a 12th place in the final world championship classification of both the 350cc-class as the 500cc-class.

Meanwhile he raced in many national races in Northern Ireland and during the Cookstown 100 of 1960 he declared that he wanted to stop racing after his friend Dave Chadwick had fatally crashed during races in Mettet.

However, in 1961 he was hired by Bultaco as factory rider. 
His season started with the 500cc race in the German GP on the Hockenheimring but he did not manage to finish with his Norton. The following 350cc race he finished in fourth place.

The next race was the Isle of Man TT. 
In de Junior TT he finished third behind Phil Read (Norton) en Gary Hocking (MV Agusta). 
In de 'Lightweight' 125cc TT he finished sixth on his Bultaco.

During the Senior TT he fatally crashed near milestone eleven of the Snaefell Mountain Course. 
At the end of that year he finished posthumously 6th in the 350cc-class and 19th in the 125cc world championship.

References

1961 deaths
English motorcycle racers
125cc World Championship riders
350cc World Championship riders
500cc World Championship riders
Isle of Man TT riders
Motorcycle racers who died while racing
Sport deaths in the Isle of Man
Sportspeople from Liverpool
Place of birth missing
1933 births
People educated at St Mary's College, Crosby